Manuel Jove Capellán (21 June 1941 - 7 May 2020) was a Spanish billionaire, and the founder of property development company Fadesa.

Jove was born in June 1941.

He was married, with two children, and lived in A Coruña, Spain.

Jove died on 7 May 2020, in A Coruña.

References

1941 births
2020 deaths
Spanish billionaires
20th-century Spanish businesspeople
21st-century Spanish businesspeople
Spanish company founders
People from A Coruña